Charles Benjamim Dowse (21 September 1862 – 13 January 1934) was the Bishop of Killaloe, Kilfenora, Clonfert and Kilmacduagh who soon after his consecration in June 1912 was translated to Cork.

Born on 21 September 1862 into an ecclesiastical family  and educated at Trinity College, Dublin, he was  ordained in 1885. His first posts were curacies at St. Catherine's Church, Dublin; Christ Church, Gorey and St Matthias Church, Dublin. After these he was Vicar of Christ Church, Dublin from  1900 to 1912; and Professor of Pastoral Theology at his old college from 1907. In June 1912 he was elevated to the episcopate, serving until September 1933. He died on 13 January 1934, leaving estate valued at £3,853 net.

References

External links
 

20th-century Anglican bishops in Ireland
Bishops of Killaloe and Clonfert
Bishops of Cork, Cloyne and Ross
Alumni of Trinity College Dublin
1862 births
1934 deaths